Mack Scogin Merrill Elam Architects is an American architecture firm based in Atlanta, Georgia. The two principal architects are husband and wife Mack Scogin and Merrill Elam. The firm was first founded in 1984 as Parker and Scogin, and later, from 1984 to 2000, as Scogin Elam and Bray, and from 2000 as Mack Scogin Merrill Elam Architects. The architects are well known for their modernist buildings, often playing on polemical themes. The architects have received numerous architectural prizes and awards for their works.

Background
The firm was founded in 1984 as Parker and Scogin. It later became Scogin, Elam and Bray (with Mack Scogin, Merrill Elam and Lloyd Bray). It became Mack Scogin Merrill Elam Architects in 2000.

Mack Scogin studied architecture at Georgia Institute of Technology and became Professor of Architecture at Harvard University Graduate School of Design, where he was chairman of the Department of Architecture from 1990 to 1995.

Merrill Elam first studied architecture at Georgia Institute of Technology, completing a Bachelor of Architecture degree in 1971, before completing a master's degree in business administration at Georgia State University in 1982. She has held several positions in schools of architecture in the USA and Canada.

Critical response 
The buildings of Mack Scogin Merrill Elam Architects have received much critical interpretation in architectural journals. But they have also attracted clients with avant-gardist aspirations. "Unusually extroverted" was what magistrates asked Mack Scogin Merrill Elam to deliver for the design of a $63 million federal courthouse in Austin, Texas. New York Times architecture critic Nicolai Ouroussoff wrote that the building exhibited a tension "between the desire to uphold core democratic values and a growing sense of instability". The building is conceived as an eight-story cube, its interlocking forms resting on a concrete base. Deep recesses set into the building create a play of light and shadow. The visual game continues inside, where the walls and walkways enclosing a lobby atrium dissolve into a cubist composition of intersecting planes. The lightness of the forms recalls the theoretical structures of Frederick Kiesler, the utopian who imagined weightless buildings suspended in air. But if you circle around to the back of the model, the upper floors begin to shift, setting the entire structure off balance.

Notable works 

United States Courthouse, Austin, Texas (2012)
Carnegie Mellon University Gates and Hillman Centers (2011)
One Midtown Plaza Lobby, Atlanta, Georgia (2007)
Yale University Health Services Center, Yale University, New Haven, Connecticut (2006)
Lulu Chow Wang Campus Center and Davis Garage, Wellesley College (2006)
Ernie Davis Hall, Syracuse University, Syracuse, New York (2005)
Harvard University Allston Campus and First Science Buildings — Harvard University, Cambridge, Massachusetts (2005)
Gates Center for Computer Science, Carnegie Mellon University, Pittsburgh, Pennsylvania (2005)
Carroll A. Campbell Jr. Graduate Engineering Center, Clemson University, Greenville, South Carolina (2004)
Zhongkai Sheshan Villas, Shanghai, China (2004)
Jean Grae Hargrove Music Library, University of California, Berkeley (2004)
Knowlton Hall, Austin E. Knowlton School of Architecture, Ohio State University (2004)
Bailey HouseStudio (2003)
Mountain Tree House, Dillard, Georgia, (2003)
Willow Street Residence Hall, Tulane University (2003)
Lee B. Philmon Branch Library (2003)
U.S. Federal Courthouse, General Services Administration, Austin, Texas, 2003
Nomentana Residence (1999)
Clark Atlanta University Art Galleries (1996)
Don and Sylvia Shaw Salon and Spa (1996)
John J. Ross – William C. Blakley Law Library, Arizona State University (1994)
Buckhead Branch Library (1993)
Turner Village at the Candler School of Theology, Emory University (1992)
House Chmar (1992)
Carol Cobb Turner Branch Library (1992)
Clayton County Headquarters Library (Scogin Elam and Bray Architects, 1988)
High Museum at Georgia-Pacific Center (1988)

Awards
Mark Scogin and Merrill Elam, Shutze Medal, Georgia Institute of Technology, 2013
Mark Scogin and Merrill Elam, Cooper-Hewitt National Design Award for Architecture with Mack Scogin, 2012 
Mark Scogin and Merrill Elam, Arnold W. Brunner Memorial Prize in Architecture, American Academy of Arts and Letters with Mack Scogin, 2011
Mark Scogin and Merrill Elam, Arts and Letters Award in Architecture, American Academy of Arts and Letters, 1995

Publications 
Mark Linder, Scogin Elam & Bray. Rizzoli, New York, 1992.
Jason Smart (ed.), Mack & Merrill: The Work of Scogin Elam and Bray Architects, Michigan Architecture Papers, no.7, University of Michigan College of Architecture + Urban Planning, 1999.
Todd Gannon, Teresa Ball (eds), Mack Scogin/Merrill Elam: Knowlton Hall, Chronicle Books, 2005.

References

External links
Mack Scogin Merrill Elam Architects website

Architecture firms based in Georgia (U.S. state)
Architects from Atlanta
Companies based in Atlanta
Design companies established in 1984
1984 establishments in Georgia (U.S. state)
American companies established in 1984